Le Corbier is a ski resort located in the Les Sybelles region of the French Alps, it is the fourth largest ski area in France with  linked by lifts and pistes. It has a mixture of all the coloured slopes (green, blue, red and black) and is 1550 metres above sea-level. There are 26 chair lifts in Le Corbier and 50 drag lifts, the highest lift is at 2600 metres. There are number of hotels in Le Corbier which include: Hotel Du Mont Corbier; Residence Maeva Les Pistes; Odalys - Les Alpages du Corbier

Surrounding Resorts 

Resorts surrounding Le Corbier are: La Toussuire; Saint-Sorlin-d'Arves and Saint-Jean-d'Arves.

Ski stations in France
Tourist attractions in Savoie
Sports venues in Savoie